Read Lawrence Morgan (January 30, 1931 – April 20, 2022) was an American film and television actor. He was known for playing the role of Sergeant Hapgood Tasker in the American western television series The Deputy.

Life and career 
Morgan was born in Chicago, Illinois. He attended the University of Kentucky, where he played basketball and football. After two years there Morgan left to study drama at Northwestern University, then served in the United States Air Force for two years. 

He began his acting career in the crime drama television series The Big Storyin 1949. Later he joined the cast of the western television series The Deputy, playing army officer Sergeant Hapgood Tasker, who had blindness in one eye, wearing a eye patch. Morgan also appeared in the Broadway play Li'l Abner. 

Morgan appeared in numerous television programs, his credits including Gunsmoke, Wagon Train, The United States Steel Hour, M Squad, How the West Was Won, Laramie, The Outsider, The Twilight Zone (episode "What You Need"), State Trooper and Paradise. He also appeared in films such as Back to the Future, Just Between Friends, The Beach Girls and the Monster, Dillinger, Lightning, the White Stallion and The New Centurions. Morgan retired in 1994; his last credit was for the film Maverick.

Morgan died on April 20, 2022, at the age of 91.

References

External links 

Rotten Tomatoes profile

1931 births
2022 deaths
People from Chicago
Male actors from Chicago
American male film actors
American male television actors
20th-century American male actors
American men's basketball players
University of Kentucky alumni
Northwestern University alumni
Western (genre) television actors
20th-century American people
21st-century American people